In statistical mechanics and quantum field theory, a dangerously irrelevant operator (or dangerous irrelevant operator) is an operator which is irrelevant at a renormalization group fixed point, yet affects the infrared (IR) physics significantly (e.g. because the vacuum expectation value (VEV) of some field depends sensitively upon the coefficient of this operator).

Critical phenomena 
In the theory of critical phenomena, free energy of a system near the critical point depends analytically on the coefficients of generic (not dangerous) irrelevant operators, while the dependence on the coefficients of dangerously irrelevant operators is non-analytic ( p. 49).

The simplest example ( p. 93) is the critical point of the Ising ferromagnet in  dimensions, which is a gaussian theory (free massless scalar ), but the leading irrelevant perturbation  is dangerously irrelevant. Another example occurs for the Ising model with random-field disorder, where the fixed point occurs at zero temperature, and the temperature perturbation is dangerously irrelevant ( p. 164).

Quantum field theory

Let us also suppose that  is positive and nonzero and  > . If  is zero, there is no stable equilibrium. However, the crucial point is, that the VEV

.

Because the nature of infrared physics also depends upon the VEV, it looks very different even for a tiny change in  not because the physics in the vicinity of  changes much — it hardly changes at all — but because the VEV we are expanding about has changed enormously.

Supersymmetric models with a modulus can often have dangerously irrelevant parameters.

Other uses of the term 
Consider a renormalization group (RG) flow triggered at short distances by a relevant perturbation of an ultra-violet (UV) fixed point, and flowing at long distances to an infra-red (IR) fixed point. It may be possible (e.g. in perturbation theory) to monitor how dimensions of UV operators change along the RG flow. In such a situation, one sometimes calls dangerously irrelevant a UV operator whose scaling dimension, while irrelevant at short distances:  , receives a negative correction along a renormalization group flow, so that the operator becomes relevant at long distances: . This usage of the term is different from the one originally introduced in statistical physics.

References

Renormalization group